Väinö Myllyrinne (27 February 1909 – 13 April 1963) was a Finnish acromegalic giant who was at one time (1940–1963) the world's tallest living person, and may have become the tallest after the death of Robert Wadlow.

Myllyrinne was born in Helsinki, Grand Duchy of Finland, and is considered the tallest soldier ever, having served in the Finnish Defence Forces. In the 1930s he travelled around Europe as a professional wrestler and circus performer. He returned to Finland in 1939 to serve in the Finnish Army during the Winter War. In 1946, he moved to Järvenpää and ran a chicken farm. He died in Helsinki in 1963 and is buried at Järvenpää.

He had a  hand span, the greatest known.

References

External links
The Tallest Man: Väinö Myllyrinne 
Väinö Myllyrinne homepage 

1909 births
1963 deaths
Finnish expatriates in the United States
Finnish male professional wrestlers
People from Helsinki
Wrestlers with acromegaly
People with gigantism